Björn Karl Zempelin (born 7 February 2000) is a German former professional footballer who played as a midfielder.

Career
Zempelin made his professional debut for Jahn Regensburg in the 2. Bundesliga on 9 May 2021, coming on as a substitute in the 84th minute for Kaan Caliskaner against VfL Bochum. The away match finished as a 5–1 loss.

In summer 2022, he decided to give his psychology studies priority and his contract was dissolved by mutual consent.

References

External links
 
 
 
 

2000 births
Living people
German footballers
Association football midfielders
SSV Jahn Regensburg II players
SSV Jahn Regensburg players
Oberliga (football) players
2. Bundesliga players